List of college athletic programs in Washington may refer to:

 List of college athletic programs in Washington (state)
 List of college athletic programs in Washington, D.C.